Thomas Cooper De Leon (May 21, 1839 – March 19, 1914) was an American journalist, author, and playwright.

Biography
Born in Columbia, South Carolina, his parents were Mordecai Hendricks de Leon and Rebecca Lopez. His older brothers were the Confederate Surgeon-General David Camden de Leon and the writer and Confederate diplomat and propagandist Edwin de Leon. Thomas Cooper de Leon served in the Confederate army from 1861 to 1865, and after the Civil War he edited The Mobile Register, The Gossip, and the Gulf Citizen (both Mobile papers; 1873–96). For many years, he managed the Mobile Mardi Gras Carnival.

He was the author of a number of works, among them Creole and Puritan (1889), The Puritan's Daughter, and Four Years in Rebel Capitals (1893). He also wrote several plays, including the comedy-drama Pluck which was produced by Lawrence Barrett in 1873. He was totally blind from 1903 and henceforward known as "The Blind Laureate of the Lost Cause".

Thomas Cooper de Leon was named for the good friend of his father, the outspoken Thomas Cooper, president of the University of South Carolina. He was buried in Magnolia Cemetery, Mobile, Alabama.

References
 Lamb, Biographical Dict. of the United States, Boston, 1900; 
 Allibone, Dict. of Authors, Supplement; 
 Who's Who in America, 1903-5

External links
 
 

1839 births
American male journalists
People of South Carolina in the American Civil War
1914 deaths
American Sephardic Jews
American dramatists and playwrights
Jewish American dramatists and playwrights
Writers from Columbia, South Carolina
Writers from Mobile, Alabama
Journalists from Alabama
American male dramatists and playwrights
Jewish Confederates